The Golden Rocket was a proposed named passenger train of the Rock Island (CRIP) and Southern Pacific (SP) railroads. Planned in the late 1940s, Southern Pacific eventually pulled out of the agreement and service never commenced.

History
In February 1946, the Rock Island and Southern Pacific Railroads planned on jointly introducing a high-speed, tri-weekly passenger train that would run between Chicago, Illinois and Los Angeles, California. Two 11-car consists were to have been placed into service on the new line, one owned by the CRIP and the other by the SP. However, just as Pullman-Standard neared completion on the Rock Island trainset in 1947, and in the midst of an aggressive advertising campaign, the Southern Pacific abruptly withdrew from the project. Rock Island took delivery of its rolling stock: a baggage-dormitory car, three coaches, a coffee shop-bar-lounge car, four sleeping cars, and a sleeper-lounge-observation car (with barbershop).

Planned rolling stock
The Rock Island consist for the Golden Rocket:
 Baggage-dormitory #820
 Coach Valle Verde
 Coach Valle Vista
 Coach Valle Mar
 Coffee-shop lounge El Café
 Diner El Comedor
 4-double bedroom, 4-compartment, 2-drawing room sleeper La Quinta
 22-roomette sleeper La Costa
 12-double bedroom sleeper La Jolla
 12-double bedroom sleeper La Palma
 2-double bedroom, 1-drawing room sleeper buffet lounge-observation La Mirada

The proposed Southern Pacific consist for the Golden Rocket that was never built:
 Baggage-dormitory
 Coach Valle Rio Grande
 Coach Valle del Sol
 Coach Valle Imperial
 Coffee-shop lounge El Café Frontero
 Diner La Fonda
 4-double bedroom, 4-compartment, 2-drawing room sleeper Monte Chiricahua
 22-roomette sleeper Monte Santa Rita
 12-double bedroom sleeper Monte San Jacinto
 12-double bedroom sleeper Santa Catalina
 2-double bedroom, 1-drawing room sleeper buffet lounge-observation La Galleria

Fate of the equipment
The units arrived bearing the ill-fated Golden Rockets eye-popping livery, painted bright vermilion on top and bare stainless steel on the bottom. The cars also retained the festive Mexican-themed interiors originally intended for the Golden Rocket. Rock Island assigned the cars to service on the Golden State, its other transcontinental train (jointly operated with Southern Pacific).

The Golden States cars and locomotives retained the Golden Rocket colors well into 1953, after which time the locomotives were repainted in the SP's well-known red-and-orange Daylight livery. Both railroads advertised the Golden Rocket. It was promoted as "America's Newest, Most Beautiful Streamliner"; instead, it became "the train that never was."

See also
 El Comedor
 Passenger trains on the Chicago, Rock Island and Pacific Railroad 
 Passenger trains on the Southern Pacific Railroad

References

Bibliography

 
 

Passenger trains of the Chicago, Rock Island and Pacific Railroad
Passenger trains of the Southern Pacific Transportation Company
Named passenger trains of the United States
Night trains of the United States